Plascencia is a surname. Notable people with the surname include:

Francisco Javier Plascencia Alonso (born 1956), Mexican politician
Javier Plascencia (born 1967), Mexican chef
Salvador Plascencia (born 1976), American writer

See also
Alfredo Placencia (1875–1930), Mexican priest and poet
Placencia, a town in Belize